Eleílson Farias de Moura (born 2 April 1985 in Nova Era, Minas Gerais) is a Brazilian footballer who currently plays as a defender for China Super League club Jiangsu Sainty.

Club career

Professional 

In March 2009, Chinese club Jiangsu Sainty had signed Eleílson on a season loan deal.
After a successful season, Jiangsu Sainty decided to buy him and signed a three-year contract. Jiangu enjoyed a great 2012 season, achieving second place with Eleílson playing extremely well in the back line.

Honours

Club
Jiangsu Suning
Chinese FA Cup: 2015

References

External links 
 

1985 births
Living people
Brazilian expatriate footballers
Association football defenders
Expatriate footballers in China
Brazilian footballers
Goiás Esporte Clube players
Jiangsu F.C. players
Brazilian expatriate sportspeople in China
Chinese Super League players